Diane McKinney-Whetstone (born August 14, 1953) is an American author and is a member of the University of Pennsylvania Creative Writing program faculty. Her works of fiction have won numerous awards, including the BCALA Literary Award for Fiction from the Black Caucus of the American Library Association, Inc. in 2005 and 2009

Biography
McKinney-Whetstone is African American. She is the second of five daughters born to Pennsylvania State Senator Paul McKinney and his wife Bessie, with an older sister from her father's previous relationship, and also an older brother and sister from her mother’s first marriage. Diane received a BA in English from the University of Pennsylvania in 1975. She is married to Greg Whetstone and they have twins, Taiwo, a daughter and Kehinde, a son.

McKinney-Whetstone began writing when she was 39, joining the Rittenhouse Writer's Group, founded by University of Pennsylvania instructor James Rahn. She won a Pennsylvania Council on the Arts grant for a 500-page first draft. Her first novel, Tumbling, was published in 1996 by William Morrow and Company.

She is mentioned in:
 Booklist, April 15, 1996, February 15, 1998, February 15, 2000.
 Book Quarterly, April 4–11, 1996.
 Detroit News, June 1, 1996.
 Essence Magazine, July 1996 November 1999, August 2000.
 Kirkus Reviews, March 15, 1996.
 Library Journal, June 15, 1996, March 1, 1998, October 1, 1999, November 1, 1999.
 Penn Arts & Sciences, fall 1996.
 Pennsylvania Gazette, May 1998.
 People Magazine, May 27, 1996.
 School Library Journal, October 1998.
 Women's Review of Books, July 1996.

Selected works
 Tumbling, 1996
 Tempest Rising, 1998
 Blues Dancing, 1999
 Leaving Cecil Street, 2004
 Trading Dreams at Midnight, 2008
 'Philadelphia Blues'
 Lazaretto, 2016

Awards and recognition
 Athenaeum Literary Award, Athenaeum of Philadelphia
 Pennsylvania Council on the Arts grant
 Finalist, Pew Fellowship in the Arts
 Zora Neale Hurston Society award for creative contribution to literature
 Citation, Commonwealth of Pennsylvania
 Author of the Year Award, Go On Girl Book Club
 American Library Association Black Caucus Award for Fiction, 2005 and 2009

References

External links 
 Interview with Diane McKinney-Whetstone on the Charlie Rose show.
 Diane McKinney-Whetstone on NJN Public Television's Another View: Bookshelf.

1953 births
Living people
University of Pennsylvania faculty
20th-century American novelists
21st-century American novelists
American women novelists
African-American novelists
20th-century American women writers
21st-century American women writers
Novelists from Pennsylvania
American women academics
20th-century African-American women writers
20th-century African-American writers
21st-century African-American women writers
21st-century African-American writers